This is a list of artistic performers that have visited the international Ekkofestival in Bergen through the years.

Ekkofestival bands and artists (in selection)

Years 2003 - 2007 

2003 (October 17–25)
 Lackluster
 Datarock
 Annie
 Brothomstates
 Skatebård

2004 (September 30 - October 3)
 Bjørn Torske
 Datarock
 Jeans Team
 Aavikko
 Andreas Tilliander
 Me At Sea
 Dub Tractor
 Mr Velcro Fastener
 Automat.piss.tool

2005 (October 20–23)
 Biosphere
 Mental Overdrive
 Moen meets Me At Sea
 ESG
 Bjørn Torske

No Ekkofestival 2006

2007 (August 23–26)
 Puma feat. Lasse Marhaug
 A Certain Ratio
 Datarock
 Me At Sea
 Sissy Wish
 Annie
 Skatebård
 Röyksopp

Years 2008 - 2011 

2008 (September 5–7)
 Zombie Zombie
 Mari Kvien Brunvoll
 Annie
 ESG
 Datarock
 Skatebård
 Planningtorock
 Automat.piss.tool.

2009 (September 24–26)
 Röyksopp
 Efterklang
 Karin Park
 Jonathan Johansson
 The Field
 Woolfy

2010 (October 15–23)
 Casiokids
 Kim Hiorthøy
 Moderat
 Lo-Fi-Fnk
 Vinnie Who

2011 (September 29 - October 1)
 Pierre Henry
 The Wombats
 Bjørn Torske
 Planningtorock
 Robert Henke
 White (Stian Westerhus & Øystein Moen) feat. Susanne Sundfør

Years 2012 - 2015 

2012 (October 22 - November 3)
 Todd Terje
 El Perro del Mar
 John Talabot
 GusGus
 Stian Westerhus
 Bjørn Torske

2013 (October 25 – November 2)
 Pantha Du Prince & The Bell Laboratory
 Holly Herndon
 Andrew Weatherall
 Jon Hopkins
 Lindstrøm
 Mykki Blanco
 Andrew Weatherall
 Vessels

2014 (October 17–25)
 Nils Frahm
 Future Brown
 The Haxan Cloak
 Shackleton

2015 (October 28–31)
 Max Cooper "Emergence"
 Kindness
 The Megaphonic Thrift
 East India Youth

References

External links 

Music in Bergen
Culture in Hordaland